William Mulligan may refer to:
 William Hughes Mulligan, American judge
 William J. Mulligan, Deputy Supreme Knight of the Knights of Columbus
 William George Mulligan, farmer, merchant and politician in Quebec